Avanigadda mandal is one of the 25 mandals in Krishna district of the Indian state of Andhra Pradesh. It is under the administration of Machilipatnam revenue division and the headquarters are located at Avanigadda. The mandal is bounded by Mopidevi, Koduru and Nagayalanka mandals.

Towns and villages 

 census, the mandal has 7 settlements and all are villages.

The settlements in the mandal are listed below:

Note: M-Municipality, †–Mandal headquarter

See also 
List of villages in Krishna district

References 

Mandals in Krishna district